Fela's London Scene is an album by Nigerian Afrobeat composer, bandleader, and multi-instrumentalist Fela Kuti, recorded in England in 1971 and originally released on the Nigerian EMI label.

Reception

AllMusic called the album "a stunning record that marks the beginning of Fela's best period of recording".

Track listing
All compositions by Fela Kuti 
 "J’Ehin-J’Ehin" – 7:26  
 "Egbe Mio" – 13:13  
 "Who’re You" – 9:30  
 "Buy Africa" – 5:51  
 "Fight to Finish" – 7:26

Personnel
Fela Kuti – electric piano, vocals
Eddie Faychum, Tunde Williams – trumpet
Igo Chico – tenor saxophone
Lekan Animashaun – baritone saxophone
Peter Animashaun – guitar
Maurice Ekpo – bass guitar
Tony Allen, Ginger Baker – drums
Akwesi Korranting, Friday Jumbo, Henry Kofi – congas
Tony Abayomi – percussion

References

Fela Kuti albums
1971 albums
Afrobeat albums
EMI Records albums